Kickback is a collection of rare and unreleased material by the funk group the Meters.

Background 
The fourteen tracks on this album were originally recorded in 1975 and 1976 for Fire on the Bayou and Trick Bag albums but were not released. The album includes original material as well as covers of songs by Earl King, The Beatles, Rolling Stones and Hank Williams. It includes a nine-minute cover of Neil Young's "Down by the River" as well as a cover of Booker T. & the M.G.'s instrumental hit "Hang 'Em High". The band had released another Neil Young cover on the Cabbage Alley album.

Reception 
Stephen Erlewine of AllMusic called the album a satisfying listen. He called the covers "intriguing" and said the band "lay[s] down a solid, irresistible groove" on the original songs. Music critic Geoffrey Himes wrote: "Kickback is no substitute for the original albums, but it offers some fascinating moments for the devoted New Orleans funk fan."

Track listing

Personnel 
Credits adopted from Allmusic.

 Primary artist
 George Porter Jr. – bass, background vocals, composer, producer
 Cyril Neville – congas, vocals, composer, producer
 Joseph Modeliste – drums, vocals, composer, producer
 Leo Nocentelli – guitar, background vocals, composer, producer
 Art Neville – keyboards, vocals, composer, producer

 Production
 Allen Toussaint – producer
 Marshall E. Sehorn – producer
 Bill Dhalle – design, liner notes
 Bob Irwin – mastering
 Bunny Matthews – photography
 Jeff Smith – design
 Tim Livingston – project manager
 Efram Turchick – project manager

References 

The Meters albums
Albums produced by Allen Toussaint
2001 compilation albums